Judith McKenzie may refer to:

 Judith McKenzie (archaeologist) (1957–2019), specialist in the art and archaeology of the Middle East
 Judith Ann McKenzie (born 1942), biogeochemist known for her research on past climate change, chemical cycles in sediments, and geobiology